Charlton St Peter and Wilsford Joint Parish Council is a grouped parish council serving the adjacent civil parishes of Charlton St Peter and Wilsford, in the Vale of Pewsey in the English county of Wiltshire.

Charlton and Wilsford elect a single parish council since their populations are small; in 2021, Wilsford had 66 electors and Charlton approximately 132. Wilsford elects two parish councillors, and Charlton five. The parishes fall within the area of the Wiltshire Council unitary authority, which is responsible for most significant local government functions.

When the joint parish council was formed, sometime before 2011, it was called Charlton and Wilsford Parish Council. During consultation for a community governance review in 2021–2022 it was proposed that St Peter should be added to the name, to reflect local usage and make a distinction from the Charlton parish in north Wiltshire. Accordingly, in May 2022, Wiltshire Council formally amended the name of the parish council to Charlton St Peter and Wilsford Joint Parish Council.

References

External links 
 

Local government in Wiltshire